The 3rd constituency of Isère is one of ten French legislative constituencies in the Isère département.

It was defined in 1986 to cover the then cantons of Fontaine-Sassenage and Grenoble III, V and VI.

Deputies

Election Results

2022

 
 
 
 
 
 
|-
| colspan="8" bgcolor="#E9E9E9"|
|-

2017

2012

2007

 
 
 
 
 
 
 
 
|-
| colspan="8" bgcolor="#E9E9E9"|
|-

2002

 
 
 
 
 
 
 
|-
| colspan="8" bgcolor="#E9E9E9"|
|-

1997

 
 
 
 
 
 
 
 
|-
| colspan="8" bgcolor="#E9E9E9"|
|-

References

3